Vista Pearl, formerly Block 20, is a skyscraper in Portland, Oregon's Pearl District, in the United States.

References

Pearl District, Portland, Oregon
Skyscrapers in Portland, Oregon